The United States Institute of Peace (USIP) is an American federal institution tasked with promoting conflict resolution and prevention worldwide. It provides research, analysis, and training to individuals in diplomacy, mediation, and other peace-building measures.

Following years of proposals for a national "peace academy," the USIP was established in 1984 by congressional legislation signed into law by President Ronald Reagan. It is officially nonpartisan and independent, receiving funding only through a congressional appropriation to prevent outside influence. The institute is governed by a bipartisan board of directors with fifteen members—which must include the secretary of defense, the secretary of state, and the president of the National Defense University—who are appointed by the president and confirmed by the Senate.

The institute's headquarters is in the Foggy Bottom neighborhood of Washington, D.C., situated at the northwest corner of the National Mall near the Lincoln Memorial and Vietnam Veterans Memorial. It currently employs around 300 personnel and has trained more than 65,000 professionals since its inception.

Mission
The United States Institute of Peace Act, passed in 1984, calls for the institute to "serve the people and the government through the widest possible range of education and training, basic and applied research opportunities, and peace information services on the means to promote international peace and the resolution of conflicts among the nations and peoples of the world without recourse to violence."

The institute carries out this mission by operating programs in conflict zones, conducting research and analysis, operating a training academy and public education center, providing grants for research and fieldwork, convening conferences and workshops, and building the academic and policy fields of international conflict management and peacebuilding. On many of its projects, the institute works in partnership with non-governmental organizations, higher and secondary educational institutions, international organizations, local organizations, and U.S. government agencies, including the State Department and the Department of Defense.

History

President Ronald Reagan signed the United States Institute of Peace Act in 1984.

Spurred by a grassroots movement in the 1970s and 1980s, Senator Jennings Randolph joined senators Mark Hatfield and Spark Matsunaga and Representative Dan Glickman in an effort to form a national peace academy akin to the national military academies. The 1984 act creating USIP followed from a 1981 recommendation of a commission formed to examine the peace academy issue appointed by President Jimmy Carter and chaired by Matsunaga.

Robert F. Turner was the institute's first president and CEO, holding that position from 1986 to 1987. He was followed by Ambassador Samuel W. Lewis (1987–1992), Ambassador Richard H. Solomon (1992–2012), and former congressman Jim Marshall (2012–2013). Kristin Lord served as acting president (2013–2014). Nancy Lindborg was sworn in as president on February 2, 2015 and served until 2020. Lise Grande was named the new president in October, 2020. In its early years, the institute sought to strengthen international conflict management and peacebuilding. In a 2011 letter of support for USIP, the Association of Professional Schools of International Affairs stated that this analytical work has "helped to build the conflict management and resolution field, both as an area of study and as an applied science".

Under Solomon's leadership, the institute expanded its operations in conflict zones and its training programs, initially in the Balkans and, after September 11, 2001, in Afghanistan and Iraq. It also became the home of several congressionally mandated blue-ribbon commissions, including the Iraq Study Group, the Congressional Commission on the Strategic Posture of the United States, and the Quadrennial Defense Review Independent Panel. Today, the institute conducts active programs in Afghanistan, Iraq, Libya, Pakistan, Sudan, South Sudan, and elsewhere.

In 1996, Congress authorized the Navy to transfer jurisdiction of the federal land—a portion of its Potomac Annex facility on what has been known as Navy Hill—to become the site of the permanent USIP headquarters, across the street from the National Mall at 23rd Street and Constitution Avenue NW, in Washington, D.C. Prior to its construction, the institute leased office space in downtown Washington. Construction of the headquarters building concluded in 2011.

Budget

USIP is funded annually by the U.S. Congress. For fiscal year 2023 Congress provided $55 million. Occasionally, USIP receives funds transferred from government agencies, such as the Department of State, USAID, and the Department of Defense. By law, USIP is prohibited from receiving private gifts and contributions for its program activities. The restriction on private fundraising was lifted for the public-private partnership to construct the USIP headquarters.

Budget debate
An op-ed in the Wall Street Journal on February 16, 2011, by Republican congressman Jason Chaffetz of Utah and former Democratic congressman Anthony Weiner of New York, attacked funding for USIP as part of the broader debate about federal spending. "The USIP is a case study in how government waste thrives," they wrote. "The idea began during the Cold War as a modest proposal with $4 million in seed money. But the organization received government funding year after year essentially because it had been funded the year before—and because it had important allies."

Former U.S. Central Command commander Anthony Zinni wrote an op-ed, published in the New York Times on March 7, 2011, in support of USIP. "Congress would be hard-pressed to find an agency that does more with less. The institute's entire budget would not pay for the Afghan war for three hours, is less than the cost of a fighter plane, and wouldn't sustain even forty American troops in Afghanistan for a year. Within the budget, peace-building is financed as part of national security programs and is recognized as an important adjunct to conventional defense spending and diplomacy. The institute's share of the proposed international affairs budget, $43 million, is minuscule: less than one-tenth of one percent of the State Department's budget, and one-hundredth of one percent of the Pentagon's."

On February 17, 2011, the House of Representatives for the 112th U.S. Congress voted to eliminate all funding for the U.S. Institute of Peace in FY 2011 continuing resolution. Funding for the institute was eventually restored by both the House and Senate on April 14, 2011, through the Department of Defense and Full-Year Continuing Appropriations Act of 2011.

Organization and leadership
The institute's staff of more than 300 is split among its Washington headquarters, field offices, and temporary missions to conflict zones. The institute is active in some 17 countries, and as of 2012 maintains field offices in Kabul, Afghanistan, and Baghdad, Iraq, as well as a presence in Islamabad, Pakistan.

Organization 

USIP coordinates its work through seven main centers:

Africa Center
Applied Conflict Transformation Center
Asia Center
Middle East North Africa Center
Policy, Learning and Strategy Center
Russia and Europe Center
The Gandhi-King Global Academy

Leadership
The institute is governed by a board of directors, with an equal number of Republican and Democratic directors appointed by the president of the United States and confirmed by the Senate. Lise Grande is the current president of the institute, having served in that role since 2020. She was preceded by Nancy Lindborg, who was preceded by Kristin Lord (acting president 2013–2014), former congressman Jim Marshall (president 2012–2013), former senior State Department official and U.S. ambassador to the Philippines Richard H. Solomon (president 1992–2012), former U.S. ambassador to Israel Samuel W. Lewis (president 1987–1988), and Robert F Turner (president 1986–1987).

Board of directors
 George E. Moose, Chair – The George Washington University, Adjunct Professor of Practice
 Judy Ansley, Vice Chair – Former assistant to the president and deputy national security advisor at the National Security Council (NSC)
 Kerry Kennedy – human rights activist and former executive director of the Robert Kennedy Memorial
 Jeremy A. Rabkin – Antonin Scalia Law School, Professor
 Stephen Hadley, Former Chair – Principal, Rice Hadley Gates, LLC
 J. Robinson West, Chair Emeritus – PFC Energy, Chairman
 Nancy Zirkin – Leadership Conference on Civil Rights, Executive Vice President
 Kathryn L. Wheelbarger – Former Acting Assistant Secretary of Defense for International Security Affairs, U.S. Department of Defense
 Edward M. Gabriel – Former U.S. Ambassador to Morocco
 Nathalie Rayes, Latino Victory Project, President and CEO 
 Mary Swig – Mary Green Enterprises, President and CEO
 Jonathan Burks – Walmart, Vice President for Global Public Policy 
 Michael Singh – Washington Institute for Near East Policy, Managing Director

Members ex officio
 Colin Kahl – Under Secretary of Defense for Policy
 Uzra Zeya – Under Secretary for Civilian Security, Democracy, and Human Rights
 Lieutenant General Michael T. Plehn – President, National Defense University

Projects

PeaceTech Lab
The PeaceTech Lab is a 501(c)(3) spun out of the United States Institute of Peace in 2014. It created the lab as a separate entity to further advance its core mission to prevent, mitigate, and reduce violent conflict around the world. The lab continues USIP's work developing technology and media tools for peacebuilding. In real terms, the lab brings together engineers, technologists, and data scientists from industry and academia, along with experts in peacebuilding from USIP, other government agencies, NGOs, and the conflict zones. These experts collaborate to design, develop, and deploy new and existing technology tools for conflict management and peacebuilding.

PeaceTech Lab CEO and founder Sheldon Himelfarb has proposed that an Intergovernmental Panel on the Information Environment (IPIE) be established along the lines of the IPCC to report on, among other things, how best to address the fake news crisis.

Convened tribes in Iraq
In Iraq in 2007, USIP helped broker the initial peace agreement that is seen as the turning point in the war there. USIP experts were asked to assist the U.S. Army's 10th Mountain Division in the reconciliation effort in Mahmoudiya, located in what was known as "the Triangle of Death" in Iraq's western Al Anbar Governorate. USIP was seen as a neutral player that was able to convene Sunni tribal leaders, Iraq's Shiite government leaders, and senior members of the U.S. military. Soon after the meeting, attacks and casualties declined significantly. The agreement led to a reduction of the U.S. military presence there from a brigade-level unit of about 3,500 soldiers to a battalion-level unit of about 650. General David Petraeus, the senior commander in Iraq, noted that the turnabout was "striking". Petraeus also said that USIP "is a great asset in developing stronger unity of effort between civilian and military elements of government".

Iraq Study Group

The U.S. government used USIP to help convene the bipartisan Iraq Study Group in 2006 that studied the conflict in Iraq and recommended ways forward. USIP facilitated the group's trip to Iraq and hosted several meetings of the group. According to USIP, the group's political neutrality made it an appropriate entity to host the group's sensitive deliberations. The effort was undertaken at the urging of several members of Congress with agreement of the White House. A final report was released to Congress, the White House, and the public on December 6, 2006.

Genocide Prevention Task Force
In Fall 2008, U.S. Institute of Peace, the U.S. Holocaust Memorial Museum, and the American Academy of Diplomacy jointly convened the Genocide Prevention Task Force to "spotlight genocide prevention as a national priority and to develop practical policy recommendations to enhance the capacity of the U.S. government to respond to emerging threats of genocide and mass atrocities".

The 14-member task force, co-chaired by former secretary of state Madeleine Albright and former defense secretary William Cohen, outlined "a national blueprint to prevent genocide and mass atrocities". In December 2008, the task force released its report "Preventing Genocide: A Blueprint for U.S. Policymakers" detailing its recommendations and guidelines. The Economist praised it as a "report steeped in good sense".

On August 4, 2011, U.S. president Barack Obama announced a proclamation suspending U.S. entry to individuals active in "serious human rights and humanitarian law violations" and called for the creation of an Atrocities Prevention Board to review, coordinate and develop an atrocity prevention and response policy, and incorporate recommendations provided by the Genocide Prevention Task Force.

Preventing electoral violence in Sudan
Ahead of Sudan's April 2010 national elections (the first since 1986) and January 2011 South Sudanese independence referendum, USIP staff traveled to some of the more unstable regions to help prepare people for the elections. Amid heightened tensions, USIP experts focused on improving cultural awareness, citizenship skills, and training Sudanese on electoral violence triggers—all critical steps to ensure that the polls did not turn violent. The elections and referendum were held with relatively no bloodshed and were widely deemed a success. Building upon USIP's successful electoral violence prevention training, USIP is implementing a series of violence prevention workshops throughout the country post-election and post-referendum.

Publication of The Iran Primer
The Iran Primer: Power, Politics, and U.S. Policy "offers a comprehensive but concise overview of Iran's politics, economy, military, foreign policy, and nuclear program". It convenes 50 experts to discuss Iran's evolving relationship with the West and "chronicles U.S.-Iran relations under six American presidents and probes five options for dealing with Iran". The Iran Primer is edited by USIP staff member Robin Wright.

Additional work

 Worked with community leaders to build peace neighborhood-by-neighborhood in Iraq
 Working with tribal chiefs, educator, and civil society leaders in support of peacemaking in Sudan
 Training hundreds of young Nigerian religious leaders, women, and youth from all over the country to be peacemakers; and helping bring peace to large parts of Plateau State
 Strengthening the peacemaking capacity of religious leaders and faith-based organizations through research, technical assistance, facilitated dialogues, and operational support
 Helping establish the rule of law, a fundamental building block to peace in Afghanistan, Iraq, Liberia, Palestine, and Nepal in addition to other security sector reform initiatives.
 Producing educational resources such as a book series on cultural negotiation, textbooks on conflict management, and online training
General reference
 The Diplomat's Dictionary 
Negotiating across Cultures: International Communication in an Interdependent World
Arts of Power: Statecraft and Diplomacy
Culture and Conflict Resolution
Country-specific
How Pakistan Negotiates with the United States: Riding the Roller Coaster
American Negotiating Behavior: Wheeler-Dealers, Legal Eagles, Bullies, and Preachers
Negotiating with Iran: Wrestling the Ghosts of History
How Israelis and Palestinians Negotiate: A Cross-Cultural Analysis of the Oslo Peace Process
French Negotiating Behavior: Dealing with La Grande Nation  	
How Germans Negotiate: Logical Goals, Practical Solutions
Case Studies in Japanese Negotiating Behavior
Negotiating on the Edge: North Korean Negotiating Behavior
Chinese Negotiating Behavior: Pursuing Interests Through 'Old Friends' 	
Russian Negotiating Behavior: Continuity and Transition

The institute has also served U.S. government officials and policymakers.

 Facilitating the Congressional Commission on the Strategic Posture of the United States, Genocide Prevention Task Force, and the bipartisan Iraq Study Group
 Leading a Congress-mandated, bipartisan task force on United Nations reform
 Developing a proposal for a comprehensive settlement of the Korean War, which was drawn upon by U.S. government officials in preparation for the Six-party talks
 Conducting a study of the U.S. government's state-building capacity that contributed to the creation of the Office of Reconstruction and Stabilization (ORS) in the State Department

Headquarters

In March 2011, USIP moved into its permanent headquarters facility at the northwest corner of the National Mall in Washington, D.C. Designed by Moshe Safdie Architects and Buro Happold, the LEED-certified building aims to serve as a symbol of America's commitment to peacebuilding. The building houses offices and staff support facilities, a library, a conference center, auditorium, classrooms, and a public education center. Officials broke ground for the new headquarters in June 2008 at a ceremony that included President George W. Bush, Senate majority leader Harry Reid, and Speaker of the House Nancy Pelosi.

Publications

USIP publishes a variety of topical newsletters, briefs, reports, guides, studies, testimony, and books related to peacebuilding and conflict management topics. It also maintains digital collections of peace agreements, oral histories, and information about truth commissions. The USIP headquarters is home to a public library that houses a collection of items related to peacebuilding, conflict management, and diplomacy. Its materials can be used on-site or requested through interlibrary loan.

In an interview with the politically progressive news website Truthout, Noam Chomsky described USIP's decision to release the Trump administration's 2018 National Defense Strategy on its website as a case where "lacking a sense of irony, the bureaucracy is quite happy to caricature Orwell."

See also
 Title 22 of the Code of Federal Regulations
 Department of Peace
 List of peace activists
 ONU Law Rule of Law LL.M. Program
 Pacifism in the United States

References

External links

 
 USIP's Global Peacebuilding Center

1984 establishments in the United States
Foreign policy and strategy think tanks in the United States
Government agencies of the United States
Moshe Safdie buildings
Nonviolence organizations based in the United States
Organizations based in Washington, D.C.
Peace and conflict studies
Government agencies established in 1984